Apurba Kumar Saikia is an Indian writer from Assam.  He was the recipient of the Sahitya Akademi Award (2020).

Early life and education
Saikia was born in Diphalu Satra, Nagaon to parents Mr. Purnadhar Saikia and Mrs. Phulmai Saikia. He is an eye specialist and chief medical officer [NFSG] of ESIC Model Hospital, Khanapara, Assam.

Bibliography

Story collections
 Bengsata
 Byortho Nayak
 Lingamukto Prithivir Xadhu Eta
 Chotor Urohi
 Bojarot Edin
 Bixoi:Premor Xangbidhan
 Maati AkhoraArticle collections
 Asomiya Manuhor GeneTranslated short story collections
 Deshi-Bideshi Galpa Sambhar Editing [published by ASAM SAHITYA SABHA ]

Awards
Saikia was awarded with Sahitya Akademi Award (2020) for his short stories collection Bengsata''. Earlier significant Awards are : Jadav Sarma Literary Award ,  Literary Excellence Award by Indian Medical Association , Antarlipi Sahitya Bota , Kathasandhi Sanman by Sahitya Akademi , Ambikagiri Roychoudhury Award for the best book on creative writing [Chotor Urohi, Short Story Collection] by Asam Sahitya Sabha.

References 

People from Nagaon district
Writers from Assam
Writers from Northeast India
Living people
1962 births
Recipients of the Sahitya Akademi Award in Assamese